The Pasoemah Expedition was a punitive expedition of the Royal Netherlands East Indies Army to the Pasoemah (also Pasumah) region in South Sumatra. The expedition lasted from 1864 to 1868.

Sources
1900. W.A. Terwogt. Het land van Jan Pieterszoon Coen. Geschiedenis van de Nederlanders in oost-Indië. P. Geerts. Hoorn
1900. G. Kepper. Wapenfeiten van het Nederlands Indische Leger; 1816-1900. M.M. Cuvee, Den Haag.'
1876. A.J.A. Gerlach. Nederlandse heldenfeiten in Oost Indë. Drie delen. Gebroeders Belinfante, Den Haag.

History of Sumatra
South Sumatra
Dutch conquest of Indonesia